Pico Maldito is the fourth highest peak in the Pyrenees, with an altitude of 3350 meters above sea level.

It is located in the Posets-Maladeta Natural Park, in the municipality of Benasque, province of Huesca, Aragon, Spain. It is part of the Macizo de la Maladeta, located in the Benasque Valley area, is made up of Paleozoic soils of a granite nature and Mesozoic materials.

References 

Mountains of the Pyrenees
Mountains of Aragon
Pyrenean three-thousanders